A list of British films released in 1931. By this point the British film industry had completed the conversion from silent to sound films. Prominent British production companies included British International Pictures and Gainsborough Pictures. The requirements of the 1927 Film Act led a number of American companies to produce or distribute films in Britain, including a growing number of quota quickies.

A-L

M-Z

Short films

See also
1931 in British music
1931 in British television
1931 in film
1931 in the United Kingdom

References

External links

1931
Films
Lists of 1931 films by country or language
1930s in British cinema